An IUD is an intrauterine device, a form of birth control.

IUD may also refer to:

 ICFAI University, Dehradun, a private university in Dehradun, India
 The Industrial Union Department, a department of the AFL–CIO